Abarlaq-e Sofla (also Romanized as Abarlāq-e Soflá; also known as Abarlāq-e Pā’īn, Avala Pāīn, and Avaleh-ye Pā’īn) is a village in Khorram Rud Rural District, in the Central District of Tuyserkan County, Hamadan Province, Iran. At the 2006 census, its population was 136, in 38 families.

References 

Populated places in Tuyserkan County